The Free File Alliance is a group of tax preparation companies which operate a public-private partnership with the Internal Revenue Service (IRS) to provide free electronic tax filing services under the IRS Free File program to United States taxpayers meeting certain guidelines. The IRS stipulates filers must have an adjusted gross income (AGI) of $73,000 or less for tax year 2022 to qualify, but participating companies can set their own requirements and restrictions. The IRS Free File program is a compromise between the IRS and for-profit tax software companies that enables lower and middle-income filers to file their taxes for free while ensuring the IRS does not develop its own free-to-use tax software that would compete with private, for-profit tax software companies.

Free File Alliance is a 501(c)(4) organization registered as Free File, Inc., and based in Clifton, Virginia. Its executive director is Tim Hugo. While many of the Free File Companies offer free state income tax returns, some companies do charge additional fees of $10 to $30 to electronically file state returns.

As of the 2021 tax filing season, the two most used tax-filing software programs (TurboTax and H&R Block) no longer participate in the Free File program. With the two largest members of the Free File Alliance ending their participation in the Free File Program, there have been renewed calls for the IRS to develop and offer its own free tax-filing software to taxpayers.

Current Alliance members
For tax year 2022, there were 7 participating Alliance members with the following requirements to qualify to use their software for free under the Free File program:
FreeTaxUSA.com, AGI of $41,000 or less. Free state return included.
Online Taxes at OLT.COM, AGI of $41,000 or less (or less than $73,000 if age 67 or older). Free state return included.
TaxAct.com, AGI of $73,000 or less AND age between 20 to 58. Free state return in some states.
TaxSlayer.com, AGI of $60,000 or less AND age 57 or younger. Free state return in some states.
FileYourTaxes.com, AGI between $8,500 and $73,000 AND age 66 or younger. Free state return in some states.
1040NOW.net, AGI of $65,000 or less AND resident of certain states. No free state returns.
ezTaxReturn.com, AGI of $73,000 or less AND resident of certain states. No free state returns.

The free state and federal tax filing services provided by MyFreeTaxes, sponsored by the charitable organization United Way, and Credit Karma Tax, which sells targeted advertising based on return data, are unrelated to the Free File program.

Criticism

Significant under-use 
In a typical year, about 70% of filers (roughly 100 million people) are eligible to use Free File, but only about three million do, according to Tim Hugo, the FFA's executive director. In 2019, for example, only 2.7% of the 104 million taxpayers eligible for Free File used it, while 34.5 million taxpayers eligible for Free File actually paid for tax software offered by companies in the Free File Alliance.

Difficult to use 
A 2019 audit of the Free File system by the Treasury Inspector General for Tax Administration found that "the process taxpayers must follow to participate in the Free File Program is obscure and complex, and there is a lack of adequate advertising and oversight of the Program by the IRS".

Deliberate efforts to hide Free File services 
The Free File Alliance has taken deliberate steps to hide its free services so that most filers continue to use paid tax preparation services. Methods used by the FFA to hide its free services and steer filers towards paid services include deliberately hiding free services from Google search results, deceptively marketing commercial tax preparation services as free and then upselling users paid services even when they are eligible for Free File, not including links to Free File services on their websites (TurboTax's Free File service, for instance, was not available on TurboTax.com), using dark patterns to push users towards paid services, and using confusing naming practices (for example, TurboTax called its Free File service the "Freedom Edition").

Lobbying efforts 
The Free File Alliance (FFA) was largely organized by Intuit, and guided by a former lobbyist for the company. In 2019, ProPublica reported that tax preparation agencies used the Free File Alliance to head off the potential "encroachment" by the IRS, which could offer its own tax preparation service or introduce return-free filing. In exchange for Intuit, H&R Block, and other members providing Free File options, the IRS was restricted from providing its own free filing tool. 

In 2020, the rule barring the IRS from designing its own filing service was lifted and providers were prohibited from hiding Free File options from search results. Despite publicly announcing their support for the changes, Intuit (the maker of TurboTax), as well as H&R Block, announced that they would be leaving the Free File Alliance.

Paid ancillary services 
In 2007, Alliance members agreed to remove controversial ancillary offerings such as refund anticipation loans from the program, after half of Free File users making ancillary purchases stated their purchases were not intended.

See also 
 Tax preparation in the United States
 IRS e-file
 Income tax in the United States
 Public-private partnerships in the United States

References

External links 
 http://www.freefilealliance.org/
 https://www.irs.gov/FreeFile
 free_file_agreement - irs.gov
  Free File Software Offers - irs.gov
 Free File Software Lookup Tool - irs.gov
 Free File: Everyone Can File an Extension for Free - irs.gov
 Free File: Do Your Federal Taxes for Free - irs.gov

Taxation in the United States
Internal Revenue Service
Public–private partnership projects in the United States
501(c)(4) nonprofit organizations
Non-profit organizations based in Virginia